Georgi Slavchev (born 1 October 1969 in Kyustendil) is a Bulgarian former footballer who played as a midfielder.

Honours

Club
Levski Sofia
 A Group (4): 1987–88, 1992–93, 1993–94, 1994–95
 Bulgarian Cup (2): 1990–91, 1993–94

CSKA Sofia
 A Group: 1996–97
 Bulgarian Cup: 1996–97

Political career
In the 2003 Bulgarian local elections, Slavchev was elected for mayor of the village Dolni Pasarel. He served until 2007.

References

External links

Player Profile at LevskiSofia.info

1969 births
Living people
Bulgarian footballers
Bulgaria international footballers
Association football midfielders
PFC Levski Sofia players
PFC CSKA Sofia players
FC St. Gallen players
FC Hebar Pazardzhik players
PFC Velbazhd Kyustendil players
First Professional Football League (Bulgaria) players
Swiss Super League players
Bulgarian expatriate footballers
Expatriate footballers in Switzerland
Expatriate footballers in Brunei
Brunei (Malaysia Premier League team) players
People from Kyustendil
Sportspeople from Kyustendil Province